As the capital of the United States, Washington, D.C. has 51 roadways which are named after each state and the territory of Puerto Rico. Many of these roadways are major avenues that serve as the city's principal traffic arteries. Every state-named roadway is an avenue except for California Street and Ohio Drive.

Organization 
While streets in Washington are generally laid out in a grid pattern, the state-named avenues often form diagonal connections between the city's many traffic circles and squares as envisioned in the L'Enfant Plan for the city. However, avenues named for Arizona, Hawaii, Mississippi, Oklahoma and Puerto Rico connect to no other state-named roadways. Avenues named for Connecticut, Georgia, Massachusetts, New Hampshire, New York, Pennsylvania, Rhode Island, and Wisconsin continue into neighboring Maryland, often as state highways, but none of the state-named avenues continue into Virginia. Most avenues exist in one or two quadrants, except for Massachusetts and Virginia Avenues, which travel through three of the four quadrants (it is geometrically impossible for a straight street to exist in all four quadrants), though they exist in multiple sections.

List

References

External links
 Washington's state named avenues
 Interactive map highlighting these roads
 Concord Avenue Becomes Missouri Avenue (1946)
 Old Columbia Heights: Where the Streets Have New Names
 Why Is It Named Constitution Avenue?
 Why Is It Named Georgia Avenue?

Streets
Streets in Washington, D.C.
Washington